Bruce Cowling (October 30, 1919 – August 22, 1986) was a film and television actor in the 1940s and 1950s.

The Oklahoma-born actor appeared in twenty films including Song of the Thin Man (1947), Battleground (1949), Ambush (1950), The Painted Hills (1951), Gun Belt (1953) as Virgil Earp  and To Hell and Back (1955).

He voiced several characters on the Lone Ranger radio show  and also made several appearances in different roles on The Loretta Young Show.

Filmography

References

External links 

1919 births
1986 deaths
American male film actors
Metro-Goldwyn-Mayer contract players
American male television actors
American male radio actors
20th-century American male actors
Male actors from Oklahoma